Movement for Change is a political party in Iraq.

Movement for Change or Movement for Changes may also refer to:

 Movement for Changes, a political party in Montenegro
 Movement for Change in Turkey (Turkish: Türkiye Değişim Hareketi), a political movement in Turkey
 Movement for Change and Prosperity, a political party in Montserrat
 Movement for Change, an activist organisation connected to the British Labour Party
 Movement for Change (Greece)